Ilselil Larsen (born 1 July 1934) is a Danish film actress. She appeared in 16 films between 1940 and 1958. She was born in Århus, Denmark.

Filmography
 Lyssky transport gennem Danmark (1958)
 Skovridergaarden (1957)
 Mig og min familie (1957)
 Cirkus Fandango (1954)
 Far til fire (1953)
 Vejrhanen (1952)
 Dorte (1951)
 Love Wins Out (1949)
 Mikkel (1949)
 Det gælder os alle (1949)
 Ny dag gryer, En (1945)
 Affæren Birte (1945)
 Mit liv er musik (1944)
 Familien Gelinde (1944)
 Vi kunde ha' det saa rart (1942)
 Barnet (1940)

External links

1934 births
Living people
Danish film actresses
People from Aarhus
Danish child actresses